In late March 1265 Sultan Baibars, Muslim ruler of the Mamluks, laid siege to Arsuf. It was defended by 270 Knights Hospitallers. At the end of April, after 40 days of siege, the town surrendered. However, the Knights remained in their formidable citadel. Baibars convinced the Knights to surrender by agreeing to let them go free. Baibars reneged on this promise immediately, taking the knights into slavery.

References

See also
 Apollonia–Arsuf

Sieges involving the Mamluk Sultanate
Conflicts in 1265
1265 in Asia
Battles of the Crusades
13th century in the Mamluk Sultanate
Military history of the Crusader states between the Seventh and Eighth Crusades